Weightlifting at the 2001 Southeast Asian Games was held from September 11 to September 14. All events were held at the Johor Jaya Multi-Purpose Hall, Johor, Malaysia.

Medalists

Men

^ Indonesia's Gustar Junianto won gold medal in the men's 62 kg but failed a drug test those stripped his medal, All three athletes behind him were upgraded from their original medal position.

Women

Medal table
Legend

References

External links
 

2001
Southeast Asian Games
2001 Southeast Asian Games events
Weightlifting in Malaysia